Bematistes adrasta is a butterfly in the family Nymphalidae. It is found in the Democratic Republic of the Congo, Kenya and Tanzania. The habitat consists of lowland forests.

Subspecies
Bematistes adrasta adrasta — southern coast of Kenya, north-eastern Tanzania
Bematistes adrasta pancalis (Jordan, 1910) — Democratic Republic of the Congo

References

External links
 Die Gross-Schmetterlinge der Erde 13: Die Afrikanischen Tagfalter. Plate XIII 57 f 
 Images representing Acraea adrasta at Bold

Butterflies described in 1892
Acraeini
Butterflies of Africa